African Americans have been violently expelled from at least 50 towns, cities, and counties in the United States. Most of these expulsions occurred in the 60 years following the Civil War but continued until 1954. The justifications for the expulsions varied but often involved a crime committed by White Americans, labor-related issues, or property takeovers.

Timeline

19th century

20th century

See also
Expelled Because of Color, a monument to African Americans expelled from the Georgia Legislature
Sundown town, a town that excludes African Americans from living in it. Many towns went sundown after expelling black populations though most sundown towns did not have significant black populations to begin with. A partial listing is available at :Category:Sundown towns in the United States.

References

expulsion
Forced migrations in the United States
Ethnic cleansing in the United States

History of racism in the United States